Boehmeria jamaicensis is a species of plant in the family Urticaceae. It is endemic to Jamaica.

Sources
 

jamaicensis
Endemic flora of Jamaica
Taxonomy articles created by Polbot
Taxobox binomials not recognized by IUCN